was a Japanese physician and bureaucrat who served as Governor of Tokyo from 1959 to 1967. In 1950, Azuma became a member of the international Olympic Committee (IOC).

Education
Born in Osaka, he attended Tokyo Imperial University and studied at the University of London, specializing in physical chemistry and physiology.

Career
He served in the Imperial Japanese Navy during World War II, took a position in the Health Ministry after the war, and later became head of Ibaraki University. In the 1950s he served as head of the Japanese Olympic Committee and played a role in bringing the 1964 Summer Olympics to Tokyo.

In 1959, he was nominated as the Liberal Democratic Party candidate for the Tokyo gubernatorial election. He defeated Socialist candidate Hachirō Arita and took office on April 27. Much of his legacy as governor surrounds the improvements to Tokyo before and during the 1964 Olympics, and accompanying pollution and administrative issues.

Personal life
In 1919, he married Teruko, a daughter of Yamakawa Kenjirō.

He is interred in the Tama Reien Cemetery in Fuchū, Tokyo, Japan.

References

|-

|-

|-

|-

|-

Governors of Tokyo
People from Osaka Prefecture
University of Tokyo alumni
Academic staff of the University of Tokyo
1893 births
1983 deaths
Japanese government officials
International Olympic Committee members
Recipients of the Order of the Rising Sun with Paulownia Flowers
Imperial Japanese Navy officers
Japanese military doctors
Japanese healthcare managers
Academic staff of Ibaraki University